The Levubu River or Levuvhu is located in the northern Limpopo province of South Africa. Some of its tributaries, such as the Mutshindudi River and Mutale River rise in the Soutpansberg Mountains.

The Luvuvhu River flows for about 200 km through a diverse range of landscapes before it joins the Limpopo River in the Fever Tree Forest area, near Pafuri in the Kruger National Park.

A Zambezi shark (Carcharhinus leucas) was caught at the confluence of the Limpopo and Luvuvhu Rivers in July 1950. Zambezi sharks tolerate fresh water and can travel far up rivers like the Limpopo. The river's crocodile population extends to its upper reaches at Thohoyandou.

Dams
 Albasini Dam 
 Mambedi Dam 
 Tshakhuma Dam 
 Damani Dam 
 Nandoni Dam, previously known as the Mutoti Dam, in the middle section of the Luvuvhu River east of the confluence with the Dzindi River tributary and east of the town Thohoyandou
 Vondo Dam in the Mutshindudi River, a tributary
 Phiphidi Dam in the Mutshindudi

See also
Drainage basin A
 List of rivers of South Africa
 List of reservoirs and dams in South Africa
Luvubu and Letaba Water Management Area

References

Rivers of Limpopo